Fellwick station was a SEPTA Regional Rail station in Springfield Township, Montgomery County, Pennsylvania. Located near the intersection of Camp Hill and Walnut Avenue, Fellwick was a station on the R5 Lansdale/Doylestown Line. Opened originally in 1855 as Sandy Run, Fellwick station was the site of the Great Train Wreck of 1856, which claimed the lives of approximately 60 people. The station was renamed to Camp Hill in March 1884, then changed to Sellwick on February 16, 1931 because the White Hill station in Camp Hill was renamed to Camp Hill. The station was later renamed to Fellwick. SEPTA closed the station on November 10, 1996 as part of several service cuts due to low ridership; that year the station only averaged eight riders per day.

References

External links
Existing Railroad stations of Montgomery County, Pennsylvania

Former SEPTA Regional Rail stations
Former Reading Company stations
Railway stations closed in 1996
Former railway stations in Montgomery County, Pennsylvania
Stations on the SEPTA Main Line